The Wenden Glacier is a glacier in the Urner Alps in the canton of Berne in Switzerland.

See also
Trift Glacier
Stein Glacier
List of glaciers in Switzerland
Swiss Alps

References

Glaciers of the canton of Bern
Glaciers of the Alps
GWenden